Mattias Lindfors (12 April 1989, Helsinki) is a Finnish sailor. He competed at the 2012 Summer Olympics in the Men's Laser class finishing in 33rd.

References

Finnish male sailors (sport)
Living people
Olympic sailors of Finland
Sailors at the 2012 Summer Olympics – Laser

1989 births
Sportspeople from Helsinki